Ghetto Stories is the first collaboration album from the duo Lil Boosie and Webbie.“Ghetto Stories” went on to sell well over 15,000 copies. The album sold 120,000 overall in the U.S.

Track listing
 "Like A Bird (Lil Boosie & Webbie)"
 "Finger Fuckin' (Lil Boosie & Webbie feat. Pimp C of U.G.K.)" 
 "Do It Big (Lil Boosie & Webbie)"
 "Had A Dream (Lil Boosie & Webbie)"
 "Dont Know Why (Webbie)"
 "Pussy Ass Nigga (Lil Boosie)"
 "Play Hard (Pimp C of U.G.K.)"
 "Money Cars (Webbie)"
 "Ghetto Stories (Lil Boosie & Webbie)"
 "Gangsta (Lil Boosie & Webbie)"
 "I Need U (Lil Boosie)"
 "Girl Go Head (Lil Boosie & Webbie feat. Lil Q & Big Head)"
 "Animosity (Lil Boosie)"
 "Happen To Ya (Lil Boosie & Webbie)"
 "Porch (Webbie)"
 "Keep It Gutta (Lil Boosie)"
 "Shit Trill (Webbie)"
 "In My Pocket (Lil Boosie feat. U.G.K.)"

References

External links
 http://www.allmusic.com/album/ghetto-stories-mw0000314995

2003 albums
Lil Boosie albums
Collaborative albums